Frederick  of Zweibrücken-Vohenstrauss-Parkstein (German: Friedrich) (11 April 1557 – 17 December 1597) was the Duke of Vohenstrauss-Parkstein from 1569 until 1597.

Life
Frederick was born in Meisenheim in 1557 as the fourth son of Wolfgang, Count Palatine of Zweibrücken. After his father's death in 1569, and still a minor, his guardianship was assumed by his older brother Philipp Ludwig until 1581, when he was obtain his own domains: the districts of Flossenbürg, Floß and Vohenstrauss with the Parkstein-Weiden enclave.

From 1586 to 1593 he built Friedrichsburg Castle near Vohenstrauss. After he had moved in there in 1593, the small town flourished. After his death in 1597, the castle was granted to her widow as her residence. On 21 February 1598, Frederick was buried with his sons in the family crypt in St. Martin in Lauingen. Since he had no surviving descendants, his domains fell to his brother Philipp Ludwig.

Marriage and Issue
Frederick married on 26 February 1587 with Katharina Sophie (7 August 1561 – 10 May 1608), daughter of Duke Henry XI of Legnica. They had three children:
Anne Sophie (Weiden, 25 November 1588 – Amberg, 21 March 1589), buried in St. Martin Basilica, Amberg.
George Frederick (Weiden, 8 March 1590 – Weiden, 20 July 1590), twin with Frederick Casimir.
Frederick Casimir (Weiden, 8 March 1590 – Weiden, 16 July 1590), twin with George Frederick.

Ancestors

External links
450. Geburtstag in: onetz.de (in German) [retrieved 7 March 2016].
Schloß Friedrichsburg bei Vohenstrauß in: friedrichsburg.de (in German) [retrieved 7 March 2016].
Stadtgeschichte Vohenstrauß in: heimat-now.de (in German) [retrieved 7 March 2016].

1557 births
1597 deaths
House of Wittelsbach
Counts Palatine of Zweibrücken